JSK Satish Kumar is a National award winning producer and actor who works in Tamil-language films.

Career 
JSK Satish Kumar has produced several films under his banner JSK Film Corporation notably including Thanga Meengal, Idharkuthane Aasaipattai Balakumara , Kuttram Kadithal and Taramani. He also distributes films under the same banner such as Paradesi. He made his debut as an actor with Taramani portraying a supporting role before he made a cameo appearance in Peranbu. He has played an important role in Agni Siragugal starring Arun Vijay, Vijay Antony, Akshara Hasan and will reportedly feature throughout much of the film. He will also star in both the Tamil and Telugu remakes of Kavaludaari, titled Kabadadaari and Kapatadhaari, respectively.   JSK Satish Kumar has acted in film Friendship as a villan charecter, starring with Harbhajan Singh, Arjun. He also acted as antagonist in a film Yarukkum Anjel starring Bindu Madhavi and directed by Ranjith Jayakodi.

Filmography

As an actor 
All films are in Tamil, unless otherwise noted.

As a producer and distributor

Awards and nominations

References

External links 

Living people
Indian film producers
Tamil film producers
Place of birth missing (living people)
Year of birth missing (living people)
Male actors in Tamil cinema